Justine Anne Fryer (born 8 October 1972) is a New Zealand former cricketer who played as a slow left-arm orthodox bowler. She appeared in 3 Test matches and 7 One Day Internationals for New Zealand between 1996 and 1997. She played domestic cricket for Wellington.

References

External links

1972 births
Living people
Cricketers from Dunedin
New Zealand women cricketers
New Zealand women Test cricketers
New Zealand women One Day International cricketers
Wellington Blaze cricketers